The sole church of the Parish of Westville, St Elizabeth's Anglican Church is an Anglican church in the Diocese of Natal of the Anglican Church of Southern Africa. It is located in the suburb of Westville, in Durban, South Africa.

External links 

Anglican church buildings in South Africa
Churches in Durban
British-South African culture